is a railway station on the Chichibu Main Line in Kumagaya, Saitama, Japan, operated by the private railway operator Chichibu Railway. The station opened on 1 April 2017.

Lines

Station layout
The station has a single 70 m long side platform serving the bidirectional single-track line. The station is located on the south side of the line with the station forecourt and drop-off/pick-up area for car users close to National Route 125.

Adjacent stations

History

The new station was proposed by the local community, with the cities of Kumagaya and Gyoda sharing the station construction cost of approximately JPY192 million. The name for the new station was officially announced in March 2016. A public poll was held to choose the name for the new station, with  receiving the most votes, but the name "Socio Ryūtsū Center" was ultimately chosen, incorporating the nickname for the nearby Kumagaya Distribution Center, to avoid confusion with other stations similarly named (notably Ryūtsū Center Station on the Tokyo Monorail). Construction of the station  structure and forecourt area commenced in fiscal 2016.

The station opened for passengers on 1 April 2017.

Surrounding area

The station is located in the city of Kumagaya, close to the border with the city of Gyoda.
  National Route 125
 Kumagaya Distribution Center
 Gyoda Driving School
 Kumagaya Higashi Junior High School
 Sayada Elementary School

See also
 List of railway stations in Japan

References

External links

  

Stations of Chichibu Railway
Railway stations in Saitama Prefecture
Railway stations in Japan opened in 2017